Bristol University Air Squadron is a University Air Squadron connected to the University of Bristol, England.

References

Royal Air Force university air squadrons